Polaromonas aquatica is a Gram-negative, oxidase- and catalase-positive, rod-shaped, non-spore-forming bacterium from the genus Polaromonas, which was isolated from tap water.

References

External links
Type strain of Polaromonas aquatica at BacDive -  the Bacterial Diversity Metadatabase

Comamonadaceae
Bacteria described in 2005